Richard Real Bird is an American politician and former chairman of the Crow Nation of Montana. Real Bird served as chairman of the Crow Nation for two terms, from 1986 until 1990.

Real Bird was convicted of fraud and embezzlement while in office. He lost his 1990 re-election bid to Crow Nation secretary Clara Nomee, who succeeded him.

References

Living people
Year of birth missing (living people)
Chairpersons of the Crow Nation
Native American leaders
20th-century Native Americans
People convicted of fraud
People convicted of embezzlement